Evgeni Mikeladze (July 27, 1903 – 1937) was a leading Georgian orchestra conductor of the 1930s, executed during the Joseph Stalin's Great Purges. 

Born in Baku, Azerbaijan, then part of Imperial Russia, he moved, with his family, to Tbilisi, Georgia in a few years. 

He attended musical classes at the Cadet Corps, Tbilisi Real School and finally entered the Tbilisi National Conservatory. Since his childhood, he played various wind instruments, chiefly the trumpet and the French horn, and decided to become a conductor in the mid-1920s. He then took courses at the Leningrad State Conservatory under the guidance of eminent Soviet conductors, Nikolai Malko and Aleksandr Gauk. Back to Tbilisi in 1931, he quickly gained notability as a talented conductor and a promoter of classical music, and earned appraisal from several Soviet and foreign musicians. He organized and led, in 1933, the National Symphony Orchestra of Georgia. A year later, he became a chief conductor at the Tbilisi Opera House.   

At the age of 33, he was awarded the title of Honored Artist of the Georgian SSR (1936). Mikeladze’s productive career was soon to be abruptly terminated, however. He was married to the daughter of Mamia Orakhelashvili, an Old Bolshevik who was purged under Stalin in 1937. Mikeladze was also arrested in November 1937 and subjected to forty-eight days of interrogation and torture, being allegedly questioned and beaten also by Lavrentiy Beria. Eventually, Mikeladze was sentenced to be shot by the NKVD troika.    

In a newly independent post-Soviet Georgia, his name has been given to the National Symphony Orchestra founded and led by Mikeladze.

His son, Vakhtang Mikeladze, is a documentary film maker currently working for the Channel One.

Notes

References 
Amy W. Knight, Beria: Stalin's First Lieutenant, Princeton University Press, Princeton, New Jersey, 1993, 
 Евгений Микеладзе

1903 births
1937 deaths
Musicians from Georgia (country)
People from Baku Governorate
Musicians from Baku
Great Purge victims from Georgia (country)
People from Georgia (country) executed by the Soviet Union
Soviet musicians